The year 1753 in science and technology involved some significant events.

Astronomy
 Ruđer Bošković's De lunae atmosphaera demonstrates the lack of atmosphere on the Moon.

Botany

 May 1 – Publication of Linnaeus' Species Plantarum, the start of formal scientific classification of plants.
 June – Establishment in Florence of the Accademia dei Georgofili, the world's oldest society devoted to agronomy and scientific agriculture.

Chemistry
 Claude François Geoffroy demonstrates that bismuth is distinct from lead and tin.

Computer science
 January 1 – Retrospectively, the minimum date value for a datetime field in an SQL Server (up to version 2005) due to this being the first full year since Britain's adoption of the Gregorian calendar.

Medicine
 James Lind publishes the first edition of A Treatise on the Scurvy (although it is little noticed at this time).

Physics
 November 25 – The Russian Academy of Sciences announces a competition among chemists and physicists to provide "the best explanation of the true causes of electricity including their theory"; the prize will be won in 1755 by Johann Euler.

Technology
 February 17 – The concept of electrical telegraphy is first published in the form of a letter from 'C. M.' to The Scots' Magazine.
 Benjamin Franklin invents the lightning rod, to ring a bell when struck by lightning, following his 1752 kite and key tests.
 George Semple uses hydraulic lime cement in rebuilding Essex Bridge in Dublin.

Awards
 Copley Medal: Benjamin Franklin

Births
 March 26 – Sir Benjamin Thompson, Count Rumford, Anglo-American physicist (died 1814) 
 April 28 – Franz Karl Achard, chemist (died 1821)
 August 3 – Charles Stanhope, 3rd Earl Stanhope, British statesman and scientist (died 1816)

Deaths
 August 6 – Georg Wilhelm Richmann, Russian physicist (born 1711)
 December – Thomas Melvill, Scottish natural philosopher (born 1726)

References

 
18th century in science
1750s in science